Koumbia may refer to:
Koumbia, Tuy Province, Burkina Faso
Koumbia, Balé Province, Burkina Faso
Koumbia, Mali
Koumbia, Guinea

See also 
 Kumbia (disambiguation)